Mimoun or Mimun may refer to the following people
Given name
Mimoun Azaouagh (born 1982), Moroccan-born German football player
Mimoun El Kadi (born 1987), Dutch football player
Mimoun Eloisghiri (born 1989), Dutch football player
Mimoun El Oujdi, Moroccan singer 
Mimoun Mahi (born 1994), Dutch football player 
Mimoun Mansouri (born 1946), Moroccan general
Mimoun Oaïssa (born 1975), Moroccan-Dutch actor and screenwriter
Mimoun Ouitot, Moroccan Olympic alpine skier
Mimoun Ouled Radi (born 1977), Dutch actor

Surname
Abdel Wahed Ben Siamar Mimun (born 1941), Moroccan Olympic basketball player
Alain Mimoun (1921–2013), Algerian-born French long-distance runner 
Martin Mimoun (born 1992), French football player
Nadia Mimoun (born 1978), French Olympic rhythmic gymnast
Rina Mimoun, American television writer and producer